Stockade Hill, Howick was the location of a stockade built by British settlers to defend from indigenous Māori during the British colonisation of New Zealand. It is located on the main road into Howick, New Zealand.

Howick's war memorial is located in the centre of the remains of the stockade's earthworks which are readily visible today.

History
The stockade was built in June 1863, for defence of British settlers against the perceived indigenous Maori threat during the New Zealand Land Wars. Howick's first resident vicar, Church of England clergyman Reverend Vicesimus Lush wrote of this in his personal diary.

The site was constructed of loop holed sheets of iron surmounting a ditch and bank, and enclosed barracks for regular troops. The local militia, British Army 70th Regiment and Bavarian mercenaries from Puhoi, camped at the stockade. At one point there were two hundred troops stationed. Women and children slept here at night for several weeks in 1863 when there was fear of attack during the Land Wars. 

Bavarian mercenaries stationed here in 1863 erected a Christmas tree, believed to be the first in New Zealand, and sang carols.

21st century
To the south of the hill on the main road can be seen the original concrete road that ran all the way from Howick to Panmure, thus allowing much shorter travel times between Howick and Auckland.

Until recently the hill had two large concrete water tanks providing water to Howick. These have now been removed. Each year the ANZAC Day (25 April) parade ends at the top of the hill, where a service is held.

At the centre of the old stockade, which is now a public park in which the stockade's perimeter earthworks are easily visible, is the Howick War Memorial, which was unveiled on 13 January 1921.

Notes

References
 
  endnotes:
'Howick War Memorial: Unveiling by Governor: Obelisk on Historic Site', New Zealand Herald, 14/1/1921, p. 6; 
 [photographs], Auckland Weekly News, 20/1/1921, supp. p. 34;
 ‘Howick News', Otahuhu News, 24/4/1935, p. 4;
 'Anzac Day Observance at Howick', Otahuhu News, 2/5/1935, p. 4;
 [Photograph], Howick Post, 10/5/1961, p. 1;
 'Large Turnout Honours War Veteran', Howick & Pakuranga Times, 27/4/2006, pp. 1, 8;
 'Stockade Hill Echoes to the Sound of the Last Post', Eastern Courier, 28/420/2006, pp. 4-5;
 'Honour for Hero', Howick & Pakuranga Times, 4/5/2006, p. 13.

Further reading

External links
 
  — "[the hill is] a place where East Auckland events are held throughout the year, whether it be small concerts, markets or festivals"
  — "16 photos and 2 tips from 33 visitors to Stockade Hill, Howick"

Geography of Auckland
History of Auckland
Howick Local Board Area